Pectobacterium betavasculorum is a plant pathogenic bacterium that infects beets. It can cause significant losses during sugar beet production and storage. Little is known about the epidemiology of this disease. Its type strain is CFBP 2122T (=LMG 2464T=NCPPB 2795T =ICMP 4226T).

References

Further reading 
 
 Janse, Jacob Dirk. Phytobacteriology: principles and practice. Cabi, 2005.
 Gnanamanickam, Samuel S., ed. Plant-associated bacteria. Springer, 2006.

External links 
 LPSN
 
 Type strain of Pectobacterium betavasculorum at BacDive -  the Bacterial Diversity Metadatabase

Enterobacterales
Bacterial plant pathogens and diseases
Bacteria described in 2003